Thakazhy railway station (Code: TKZ) is a railway station in Alappuzha District, Kerala and falls under the Thiruvananthapuram railway division of the Southern Railway zone, Indian Railways.

Railway stations in Alappuzha district
Railway stations opened in 1989